Leporid alphaherpesvirus 4 (LeHV-4) is a species of virus in the genus Simplexvirus, subfamily Alphaherpesvirinae, family Herpesviridae, and order Herpesvirales.

References

External links
 

Alphaherpesvirinae